Christer Lennart Olsson (born July 24, 1970) is a Swedish former professional ice hockey defenceman. He is the current head coach of VIK Västerås HK in the HockeyAllsvenskan (Allsv). Olsson played briefly in the National Hockey League (NHL) with the St. Louis Blues and Ottawa Senators.

Playing career
Olsson was drafted by the Blues in the 11th round, 275th overall in the 1993 NHL Entry Draft. He played in Sweden for 2 years before splitting the 1995–1996 season with the Worcester Ice Cats of the AHL and making his debut with the Blues. The following season he was part of an infamous and extremely lopsided trade when he was traded by the Blues to the Ottawa Senators for Pavol Demitra. Demitra eventually became a scoring powerhouse with the Blues for a number of years while Olsson decided to go back to Sweden to play hockey after his short stint with the Senators that year.

Olsson played 7 more years in Sweden and one in Austria before retiring after the 2004–05 season.

Coaching career 
Since his retirement after the 2004–2005 season, Olsson directly coached Leksands IF. He has mostly been coaching Leksand's representation team, but he has also coached Leksand's under-20 team in two seasons. On April 20, 2011, Olsson was named the head coach of Leksand's representation team in the HockeyAllsvenskan. Olsson was sacked as Leksands IF coach in 2011 and then joined EC KAC of the Austrian Hockey League. He coached parts of two seasons with KAC before he was fired and then named coach of rival EBEL club, HC TWK Innsbruck.

After two seasons in Innsbruck, Olsson opted to return to his native Sweden, accepting a head coaching role with VIK Västerås HK of the Allsvenskan for the 2016–17 season.

Career statistics

Regular season and playoffs

International

References

External links

1970 births
Living people
Brynäs IF players
Frölunda HC players
Ice hockey coaches
Leksands IF players
Ottawa Senators players
People from Arboga Municipality
St. Louis Blues draft picks
St. Louis Blues players
Swedish expatriate sportspeople in Austria
Swedish expatriate ice hockey players in Canada
Swedish expatriate ice hockey players in the United States
Swedish ice hockey defencemen
Worcester IceCats players
Sportspeople from Västmanland County